Amateur Shortwave Radio is a live album by Over the Rhine, released in 1999, compiled by Linford Detweiler to mark the 10th anniversary of the band's first recordings in 1989.

Track listing
1.  Like A Radio - 8:55
Recorded at the Emery Theatre, Cincinnati, Ohio, December 1995.
2.  Ruby Tuesday - 4:35
Produced by Ric and Linford, April 1999.
3.  Mary’s Waltz - 4:16
Recorded at Devou Park, Covington, Kentucky with the Northern Kentucky Symphony, September 1997. 
Northern Kentucky Symphony conducted by James R. Cassidy.  Orchestration by Terry LaBolt.
4.  Blackbird - 4:44
Recorded for Nightwaves, WVXU, November 1990.
5.  Moth - 5:06
Recorded at Echo Park, May 1998.
6.  Jack’s Valentine - 5:45
Recorded for live broadcast on Audiosyncracies, WVXU, July 1997.
7.  Circle of Quiet - 7:45
Recorded at Canal Street Tavern, Dayton, Ohio, March 1999.
8.  Anyway - 4:47
Recorded at Echo Park, May 1998.
9.  My Love is A Fever - 5:00
Recorded at the State Theatre, Portland, Maine, September 1994.
10.  I Will Remember - 7:27
Recorded at Echo Park, May 1998.

Personnel

Karin Bergquist - Voice, Acoustic Guitar, Piano
Linford Detweiler - Bass, keyboards, spoken word
Ric Hordinski - Electric guitar, e-bow
Brian Kelley - drums, harmony vocal
Jack Henderson - electric guitar
Terri Templeton - harmony vocal
Mike Georgin - bass

References

Over the Rhine (band) albums
1999 live albums